Fairbanks Street station is a light rail stop on the MBTA Green Line C branch in Brookline, Massachusetts, located in the median of Beacon Street. Fairbanks station has two side platforms serving the line's two tracks. It is not accessible, although a wheelchair lift allows accessible transfer between the two elevations of the two halves of Beacon Street at the station.

Track work in 2018–19, which included replacement of platform edges at several stops, triggered requirements for accessibility modifications at those stops. By December 2022, design for Fairbanks Street and seven other C Branch stations was 15% complete, with construction expected to take place in 2024.

References

External links

MBTA - Fairbanks Street
Station from Google Maps Street View

Green Line (MBTA) stations
Railway stations in Brookline, Massachusetts